The Bizzaria of Florence (Citrus medica + C. aurantium), which is probably the first graft chimera obtained, is a graft between the Florentine citron and sour orange.

It produces branches of regular Florentine citron including such leaves, and from the other side branches of sour orange. The middle shoot mixes characteristics of both and the fruit exhibits characteristics of both the citron and orange.

Graft chimerism contrasts with somatic hybridization which is due to plant sexuality; its offspring is intermediate, showing influences of both parental plants. The Florentine Bizzaria, on the other hand, displays an unusual fruit which distinctly expresses characteristics from each plant in close proximity.

The plant's name has a number of different spellings, e.g. Bizaria, Bizzarria, Bizarria, and even Bizarre.

Discovery
The Bizzaria was discovered in 1640 by Pietro Nati at the villa named Torre degli Agli, which belonged to the wealthy Panciatichi banking family. The Bizzaria was thought to be lost but was rediscovered in the 1970s by Paolo Galleotti, the head gardener of the Villa di Castello and of the Boboli Gardens in Florence.

See also
 Citrus hybrid
 Citrus taxonomy
 Grafting
 Graft-chimaera

References

External links

 The Bizzaria Story
 Hereditary Journal
 The Citrus Industry
 Charles Darwin about the Bizzaria

Citrus
Graft chimeras